Wulfstan ( – 20 January 1095) was Bishop of Worcester from 1062 to 1095. He was the last surviving pre-Conquest bishop. Wulfstan is a saint in the Western Christian churches.

Denomination
His denomination as Wulfstan II is to indicate that he is the second Bishop Wulfstan of Worcester. This, however, does not prevent confusion, since the first Bishop Wulfstanhis maternal uncleis also called Wulfstan II to denote that he was the second Archbishop of York called Wulfstan.

Life

Wulfstan was born about 1008 at Long Itchington in the English county of Warwickshire. His family lost their lands around the time King Cnut of England came to the throne. He was probably named after his uncle, Wulfstan II, Archbishop of York. Through his uncle's influence, he studied at monasteries in Evesham and Peterborough, before becoming a clerk at Worcester. During this time, his superiors, noting his reputation for dedication and chastity, urged him to join the priesthood. Wulfstan was ordained shortly thereafter, in 1038, and soon joined a monastery of Benedictines at Worcester.

Wulfstan served as treasurer and prior of Worcester, and from 1034 onwards served as the parish priest of Hawkesbury, Gloucestershire. When Ealdred, the bishop of Worcester as well as the Archbishop of York, was required to relinquish Worcester by Pope Nicholas, Ealdred decided to have Wulfstan appointed to Worcester.  In addition, Ealdred continued to hold a number of the manors of the diocese. Wulfstan was consecrated Bishop of Worcester on 8 September 1062, by Ealdred.  It would have been more proper for him to have been consecrated by the Archbishop of Canterbury, whose province Worcester was in. Wulfstan had deliberately avoided consecration by the current archbishop of Canterbury, Stigand, since Stigand's own consecration had been uncanonical. Wulfstan still acknowledged that the see of Worcester was a suffragan of Canterbury. He made no profession of obedience to Ealdred, instead offering a profession of obedience to Stigand's successor Lanfranc.

Wulfstan was a confidant of Harold Godwinson, who helped secure the bishopric for him.

A social reformer, Wulfstan struggled to bridge the gap between the old and new regimes, and to alleviate the suffering of the poor. He was a strong opponent of the slave trade, and together with Lanfranc, was mainly responsible for ending the trade from Bristol.

After the Norman conquest of England, Wulfstan was the only English-born bishop to retain his diocese for any significant time after the Conquest (all others had been replaced or succeeded by Normans by 1075).  William noted that pastoral care of his diocese was Wulfstan's principal interest.

In 1072 Wulfstan signed the Accord of Winchester. In 1075, Wulfstan and the Worcestershire fyrd militia countered the Revolt of the Earls, when various magnates attempted a rebellion against William the Conqueror.

Wulfstan founded the Great Malvern Priory, and undertook much large-scale rebuilding work, including Worcester Cathedral, Hereford Cathedral, Tewkesbury Abbey, and many other churches in the Worcester, Hereford and Gloucester areas. After the Norman Conquest, he claimed that the Oswaldslow, a "triple hundred" administered by the bishops of Worcester, was free of interference by the local sheriff.  This right to exclude the sheriff was recorded in the Domesday Book in 1086.  Wulfstan also administered the diocese of Lichfield when it was vacant between 1071 and 1072.

As bishop, he often assisted the archbishops of York with consecrations, as they had few suffragan bishops. In 1073 Wulfstan helped Thomas of Bayeux consecrate Radulf as Bishop of Orkney, and in 1081 helped consecrate William de St-Calais as Bishop of Durham.

Wulfstan was responsible for the compilation by Hemming of the second cartulary of Worcester. He was close friends with Robert Losinga, the Bishop of Hereford, who was well known as a mathematician and astronomer.

Wulfstan died 20 January 1095 after a protracted illness, the last surviving pre-Conquest bishop. After his death, an altar was dedicated to him in Great Malvern Priory, next to those of Thomas Cantilupe and King Edward the Confessor.

Legacy
At Easter of 1158, Henry II and his wife Eleanor of Aquitaine visited Worcester Cathedral and placed their crowns on the shrine of Wulfstan, vowing not to wear them again. Their son King John is buried at Worcester Cathedral.

Soon after Wulfstan's death, a hagiography, or saint's life, was written about him in English by his former chancellor Colman.  It was translated into Latin by the medieval chronicler and historian William of Malmesbury.  Wulfstan was canonized on 14 May 1203 by Pope Innocent III. One of the miracles attributed to Wulfstan was the curing of King Harold's daughter. The recently founded Victorine priory in Celbridge, Ireland (paid for by Adam de Hereford) was named St. Wolstan's Priory in his honour.

In 2021, St. Mary's Church, Hawkesbury, where Wulfstan served as incumbent from 1034, installed a ring of eight bells in their tower. The largest bell, weighing 600 kg, is named in honour of Wulfstan.

Wulfstan is remembered in the Church of England with a lesser festival and on the Episcopal Church calendar on 19 January.

Notes

Citations

References

 Attwater, Donald and Catherine Rachel John. The Penguin Dictionary of Saints. 3rd edition. New York: Penguin Books, 1993. .
 British History Online Bishops of Worcester accessed on 3 November 2007
 
 
 
 
 Walsh, Michael A New Dictionary of Saints: East and West London: Burns & Oates 2007 
 William of Malmesbury. The Life of St Wulstan

External links
 
 Catholic Encyclopedia Online: St. Wolstan
 Claines Church, Worcester, built by Wulfstan

1000s births
1095 deaths
Anglo-Saxon saints
Anglo-Saxon Benedictines
Bishops of Worcester
People from Stratford-on-Avon District
Priors of Worcester
11th-century English Roman Catholic bishops
11th-century Christian saints
Burials at Worcester Cathedral
Pre-Reformation Anglican saints
Anglican saints